Sävsjö is a locality and the seat of Sävsjö Municipality, Jönköping County, Sweden with 5,122 inhabitants in 2010.

Geography
Sävsjö is located on the main line railway between Stockholm and Malmö. The distance to Malmö is about 220 kilometers.

History
Sävsjö regards the date 1 October 1864, as the start of its current history, because it was then that the train station Sävsjö was inaugurated. At that time Sävsjö was nothing more than a few houses, but attracted by the railway it began expanding, attracting both industries and inhabitants. The settlement with its then 1.56 square kilometres had 1,481 people in 1917 at which time several small industries had established themselves there, most notably carpenters and other wood industries, and there was also a bank, a pharmacy and a post office.

In 1947 the rural municipalities Norra Ljunga and Vallsjö in which the settlement was situated were combined and formed the City of Sävsjö. Since the local government reform of 1971 Sävsjö is the seat of the much larger Sävsjö Municipality. The Swedish emigrant Jonas Bronck, founder of the borough The Bronx, New York City, was born outside of today's Sävsjö town in the hamlet of Komstad.

References 

Municipal seats of Jönköping County
Swedish municipal seats
Populated places in Jönköping County
Populated places in Sävsjö Municipality